Argonne Forest may refer to:
 Forest of Argonne, France
 Argonne Forest, Atlanta, a neighborhood in the United States